Vali-ye Asr or Vali Asr or Valieasr may refer to:

 Vali Asr, Ardabil
 Vali-ye Asr, East Azerbaijan
 Vali-ye Asr, Khuzestan
 Vali-ye Asr, Lorestan
Valieasr, Lorestan
 Vali Asr, Mazandaran